Azle Independent School District is a public school district based in Azle, Texas, United States. The district covers northwestern Tarrant County, northeastern Parker County, and a small portion of southern Wise County. In addition to Azle, the district serves the communities of Lakeside, Pelican Bay, Sanctuary, and portions of Reno and Briar.

Finances
As of the 2018-2019 school year, the appraised valuation of property in the district was $2,351,893,000. The maintenance and operations tax rate was $1.170, and the interest and sinking fund tax rate was $0.1590 per $100 of appraised valuation.

Academic achievement
In 2011, the school district was rated "academically acceptable" by the Texas Education Agency.  About 49% of districts in Texas in 2011 received the same rating. No state accountability ratings will be given to districts in 2012. A school district in Texas can receive one of four possible rankings from the Texas Education Agency: Exemplary (the highest possible ranking), Recognized, Academically Acceptable, and Academically Unacceptable (the lowest possible ranking).

Historical district TEA accountability ratings
2011: Academically Acceptable
2010: Recognized
2009: Recognized
2008: Academically acceptable
2007: Academically acceptable
2006: Academically acceptable
2005: Academically acceptable
2004: Academically acceptable

Schools
As of the 2020-2021 school year, 13 schools were in Azle ISD.

High school
Grades 9-12
Azle High School

Junior high schools
Grades 7-8
Azle Junior High School

Santo J. Forte Junior High School

Elementary schools
Grades 5-6
Azle Elementary School
W.E. Hoover Elementary School
Kindergarten - grade 4
Cross Timbers Elementary School
Eagle Heights Elementary School
Liberty Elementary School
Silver Creek Elementary School
Walnut Creek Elementary School

Alternative schools
DAEP
Hornet Academy
Pre-K Center

Special programs

Fine arts
Azle High School has an exemplary band program, with the Marching Green Pride ranking 13th in Texas in the 2013-2014 State Marching Band Competition in San Antonio.

Athletics
Azle High School participates in the boys' sports of baseball, basketball, football, tennis, soccer, and wrestling. The school participates in the girls' sports of basketball, soccer, softball, tennis, volleyball, and wrestling.

The Azle High School Cheer team became the first coeducational team to win the UIL State Cheerleading Championship in early 2016.

For the 2015 through 2016 school years, Azle High School will play football in UIL Class 5A. The mascot is a hornet named "Buzzy".

Alumni
 Chas Skelly, professional Mixed Martial Artist, current UFC Featherweight
 James Casey (American football), former NFL tight end, current tight ends coach with Houston Cougars football

See also

List of school districts in Texas
List of high schools in Texas

References

External links
 

School districts in Tarrant County, Texas
School districts in Parker County, Texas
School districts in Wise County, Texas